Sugar Mice is a song by the British neo-progressive rock band Marillion. It was the second single from their fourth studio album Clutching at Straws. Released on 13 July 1987, it peaked at number 22 in the UK Singles Chart, becoming the band's eighth top-thirty hit in a row. Outside the UK, it was released in France, Republic of Ireland, Netherlands, Portugal, West Germany and (on Capitol Records) in the United States and Canada.

Background

A protest song which directly addresses the devastating effect unemployment can have on personal relationships, the track takes the form of a melancholic rock ballad with lyrics from the perspective of a British worker who emigrates to the U.S. to find a job, leaving behind his family. He ends up in despair, drinking in a hotel bar in Milwaukee and blaming the government for leaving him out of work. Lyricist Fish described the background as follows:

I was laying  in bed in the Holiday Inn and looking up at the ceiling at some hearts 'n' stuff that some lovers had carved, and I was feeling really down. So I rang my old lady but it was a bad phone call; lots of long silences. I felt even more depressed.

The first-person narrator sums up his feelings with the metaphor "We're just sugar mice in the rain", which lends the title to the song.

Performing it at the band's concert Live from Loreley in 1987, Fish dedicated it to "all the unemployed people in Europe today, to the romantics, to the dreamers and to those who still have hearts".

Release
A number of formats were available: 7" single, 7" picture disc (containing a fold-out sleeve with a poster), 12" single, 12" picture disc. 3,000 copies of a 5" CD single were produced that were exclusively sold at concerts.

The 12" and 5" CD single featured an extended version of the title track, containing some extra music between the first and second verse.

The B-side, "Tux On", is a song that tells the story of a rising rock star who gradually loses touch with reality and finally ends up abusing drugs.

A CD replica of the single was also part of a collectors box-set released in July 2000 which contained Marillion's first twelve singles and was re-issued as a 3-CD set in 2009 (see The Singles '82–88').

"Sugar Mice" was featured on the compilations Now That's What I Call Music 10 and 100 Hits: 80s Classics.

Cover art
The cover was designed by the band's regular artist Mark Wilkinson. Unlike the covers of the album Clutching at Straws and the first single from it, "Incommunicado", which had been collages based on photographs, this one again featured Wilkinson's signature airbrush style. It shows sugar mice around a cocktail glass, melting from spilled liquid, with a male face in the background.

Track listing

7" single

Side A 
"Sugar Mice" (Album Version)—05:47

Side B 
"Tux On"—05:12

7" Picture disc 
"Sugar Mice" (Radio Edit)—05:00

Side B 
"Tux On"—05:09

12" Single/picture disc

Side A 
"Sugar Mice" (Extended Version)—06:08

Side B 
"Sugar Mice" (Album Version)—05:45
"Tux On"—05:12

5" CD Single 
"Sugar Mice" (Radio Edit)—05:00
"Tux On"—05:09
"Sugar Mice" (Extended Version)—06:09
Total Time 16:26

All tracks written by Dick/Rothery/Kelly/Trewavas/Mosley.

Personnel
Fish – vocals
Steve Rothery - guitars
Mark Kelly - keyboards
Pete Trewavas - bass
Ian Mosley - drums

References 

1980s ballads
1987 singles
1987 songs
EMI Records singles
Marillion songs
Political songs
Protest songs
Rock ballads
Song recordings produced by Chris Kimsey
Songs written by Fish (singer)
Songs written by Mark Kelly (keyboardist)
Songs written by Ian Mosley
Songs written by Steve Rothery
Songs written by Pete Trewavas